Shockmain Nastase Davis (born August 20, 1977) is a former American football wide receiver. He attended Angelo State University.

Professional career
Davis was originally signed by the New England Patriots of the NFL in 2000 as an undrafted free agent. He played twelve games for the Patriots that year. In 2002, he was signed by the Seattle Seahawks and made it to the final cuts, then was released. In 2003, Davis signed with the Toronto Argonauts in the CFL where he suffered a broken leg in training camp. Davis also had stints in the NIFL for the Beaumont Drillers. In 2004, Davis was signed by the Green Bay Packers and was allocated by the Packers to play in NFL Europe. Davis made the all NFL Europe team as a kick returner with 19 returns for 571 yards, averaging 30.05 yards per return and a long of 93 yards along with two touchdowns. He was released by the Packers after suffering another broken leg in 2005. Later, Shockmain was signed by the Winnipeg Blue Bombers and then was traded to the Toronto Argonauts, where he suffered a torn ACL in a game against the Montreal Alouettes. Shockmain retired from professional football shortly after the ACL injury.   
 
He last played for the Toronto Argonauts of the Canadian Football League.

External links
 Toronto Argonauts profile
 NFL stats from databasefootball.com
 Just Sports Stats

1977 births
American football wide receivers
African-American players of American football
Players of American football from Texas
Living people
Sportspeople from Port Arthur, Texas
Angelo State Rams football players
Blinn Buccaneers football players
New England Patriots players
National Indoor Football League
Rhein Fire players
Canadian football wide receivers
African-American players of Canadian football
Winnipeg Blue Bombers players
Toronto Argonauts players
21st-century African-American sportspeople
20th-century African-American sportspeople